Adam Gottlieb Weigen (1677–1727) was a German pietist, theologian and early animal rights writer.

Weigan was the son of a surgeon and was born at Waiblingen in 1677. He studied theology at Württemberg but also took interest in anatomy and natural science. Weigen became a pastor and advocate of pietism in Leonberg. He took up this post in 1705. Weigan was influenced by the writings of Philipp Spener. 

Weigen argued for a compassionate treatment of the animals from a Christian theological framework. In 1711, Weigen authored De Jure Hominis in Creaturas. It has been described as "the first work ever to deal with the topic of animal rights as a general theme." The book became known in Denmark and inspired Laurids Smith. It was republished in 2008.

Weigen moved to Wahlheim, where he died in 1727.

Selected publications
De Jure Hominis in Creaturas (1711)

References

1677 births
1727 deaths
18th-century German male writers
18th-century German Protestant theologians
German animal rights scholars